The 1952 Ohio gubernatorial election was held on November 4, 1952. Incumbent Democrat Frank Lausche defeated Republican nominee Charles Phelps Taft II with 55.90% of the vote.

Primary elections
Primary elections were held on May 6, 1952.

Democratic primary

Candidates
Frank Lausche, incumbent Governor

Results

Republican primary

Candidates
Charles Phelps Taft II, Cincinnati City Councilman
Thomas J. Herbert, former Governor
Roscoe R. Walcutt, State Senator

Results

General election

Candidates
Frank Lausche, Democratic
Charles Phelps Taft II, Republican

Results

References

1952
Ohio
Gubernatorial